Eriauchenus andriamanelo is a species of spider in the family Archaeidae. It is endemic to Madagascar.

Taxonomy 
The holotype was collected by Hannah Wood and Nikolaj Schraff in the Montagne d'Ambre National Park. The specific name commemorates King Andriamanelo, the founder of the Merina Kingdom. The genus name has also been incorrectly spelt "Eriauchenius".

Habitat and distribution 
The spider is found from northern to central western Madagascar.

References 

Archaeidae
Spiders described in 2018